Ferenc Kovács (7 January 1934 – 30 May 2018) was a Hungarian footballer and coach. He played for MTK and was capped once for Hungary. He won a bronze medal at the 1960 Summer Olympics in football.

References

External links 
 
 

1934 births
2018 deaths
Hungarian footballers
Hungary international footballers
MTK Budapest FC players
Footballers at the 1960 Summer Olympics
Olympic footballers of Hungary
Olympic bronze medalists for Hungary
Hungarian football managers
Hungarian expatriate football managers
MTK Budapest FC managers
Fehérvár FC managers
Vasas SC managers
Hungary national football team managers
Debreceni VSC managers
UD Las Palmas managers
Újpest FC managers
Olympic medalists in football
Medalists at the 1960 Summer Olympics
Association football defenders
Nemzeti Bajnokság I managers
Footballers from Budapest